Joseph-François de Payan, known as Payan-Dumoulin (9 February 1759, Saint-Paul-Trois-Châteaux - Alixan, 20 May 1852) was a political figure during the French Revolution, as was his younger brother Claude-François de Payan.

References

People of the French Revolution
1759 births
1852 deaths